This list contains the names of albums that contain a hidden track and also information on how to find them. Not all printings of an album contain the same track arrangements, so some copies of a particular album may not have the hidden track(s) listed below. Some of these tracks may be hidden in the pregap, and some hidden simply as a track following the listed tracks. The list is ordered by artist name using the surname where appropriate.

 ABBA, Super Trouper: On the original vinyl version, the audience applause at the end of the last track continued into the inner groove, playing infinitely until the needle is removed.
 Abbath, Abbath: On some editions tracks 9 and 10 are not mentioned on the back cover.
 AC/DC, Volts: Several audio tracks and radio interviews after the end of the final track, "Ride On."
 Acid Bath, Paegan Terrorism Tactics: The penultimate track contains a large period of silence (from 7:24 to 24:08), before the unlisted hidden track, "The Beautiful Downgrade."
 Add N to (X):
 Avant Hard (1999): Hidden track following 0:33 of silence after the final track.
 Add Insult to Injury (2000): "Violent Breath" follows silence after the final track
 Aerosmith:
 Just Push Play: Reprisal of "Under My Skin" following "Avant Garden" (following "Face" on the international album).
 Live! Bootleg: "Draw the Line" at the end of the "Mother Popcorn" track.
 Pandora's Box: Untitled track at the end of disc 3, later named "Circle Jerk" on Box of Fire.
 Pump: Untitled, instrumental track following "What It Takes."
 Aesop Rock:
None Shall Pass: After "Coffee," there are approximately two minutes of silence, followed by a hidden track titled "Pigs."
 Daylight: After "Maintenance," there are approximately fifteen minutes of silence, followed by a hidden track, "One of Four."
 AFI:
 The Art of Drowning: "Battled," following "Morningstar."
 Black Sails in the Sunset: 10:30 into the track "God Called in Sick Today" starts the hidden track "Midnight Sun."
 Decemberunderground: Track 7 (Affliction) actually contains two songs, called "Affliction" and a hidden track titled "Then I'll Be Home." A second hidden track can be found by rewinding up to 21 seconds before the first track (Prelude 12/21) there is a hidden introduction, extending the track to 1:42 minutes.
 Very Proud of Ya: Rewinding the first track reveals the track "No Dave Party."
 Afghan Whigs, Congregation (1992): Unlisted track 12, "Miles Iz Ded."
 Agoraphobic Nosebleed:
 Frozen Corpse Stuffed with Dope: Untitled hidden track begins at 4:55 after the final track.
 Altered States of America: Track 0 "Wonder Drug Wonderland".
 Christina Aguilera, Stripped: a hidden outro in which two guys ask Christina if it's over follows the final track, "Keep on Singing My Song," after around a half-minute of silence
 Todd Agnew:
 Grace Like Rain: "Savior, Like a Shepherd Lead Us" (begins at 11:00 of "Wait For Your Rain")
 Reflection of Something: "It Is Well" (track 15)
 Aiden:
Nightmare Anatomy: The last track, "See You in Hell," contains an echoing voice talking about nightmares.
Our Gangs Dark Oath: The beginning of "World by Storm" contains a sound clip from the courtroom scene of Boondock Saints.
"World by Storm" ends at 3:50 followed by a period of silence until 8:00. Then an untitled hidden track begins, a track which contains a piano. The "Piano Track" plays in regular time until 10:30, at which point the song fades out for just a second and exactly the same song begins playing in reverse. This plays until 13:00.
At this point, the song ends and another period of silence begins. This silence ends at 15:10 and another untitled hidden track begins: this one containing acoustic guitar and the lead singer's voice. This track leads to the end of the song and album.
 Akercocke, Rape of the Bastard Nazarene: Track 66 "The Blood Of Khaos" (tracks 11-65 have no audio content). And on the first press CD track 1 is not mentioned on the rear cover.
 Alan Doyle, So Let's Go: The last track (track 11), "I Am A Sailor" is not listed
 Alastor, Nothing for Anyone: The last two tracks, "Debaser" and a cover of "Ball and Chain", are not listed.
 Alcazar:
 Alcazarized (2004): Hidden track "Here I Am" follows track 15 'Someday' (Scandinavian edition) and track 12 'Crying at the Discothèque' (Rest of Europe edition)
 Casino (2001): Hidden track "Blues in G Minor" follows track 15 "The Bells of Alcazar"
 Aleixa, Disfigured (1999): Track 13 is an outtake from the song "Pacify Me"
 Alesana Try This With Your Eyes Closed: Unlisted track "Early Mourning."
 Alejandro Sanz: El Alma al Aire (2000) the last track contains a hidden track called Desde mis centros
 Alice in Chains, Dirt: "Iron Gland" is unlisted between "God Smack" and "Hate To Feel”. It's also called “Dream Sequence”.
 Alien Ant Farm:
 3rd Draft: "Tragedy" and "Say Something" follow the last track "She's Only Evil."
 Anthology: "Orange Appeal" following on from final track "Universe"
 Up in the Attic: "Beehive" and "Album End" follow the last track "She's Only Evil."
 The All American Rejects, When the World Comes Down: "Sunshine" is a hidden track that is revealed after a blank track following the last listed song.
 All Star United:
 All Star United: The last track "Lullaby" ends at 4:05. After 3 minutes of silence (4:05 - 7:05), begins the hidden track "Vitamins", that begins at 7:05 and ends at 8:15.
 International Anthems for the Human Race: "Hurricane" and a sped-up demo version of "International Anthem" follow the last track "Put Your Arms Around Me"
 Gary Allan, It Would Be You: Features unlisted song called "No Judgment Day" as a hidden track.
 Altan: The Best of Altan: Although not a hidden track, a bonus disc (in a similar vein to an album by The Cult) of live performances is featured in the package and remains completely unlisted. Its track listing is featured on the rear cover of which the disc faces.
 Altered Images: I Could Be Happy: The Best of Altered Images: "Happy New Year" follows silence after last track "Thinking About You."
 alt-J: This is All Yours: "Lovely Day" follows silence after last track "Leaving Nara."
 AM Conspiracy, Self-titled After the song "Learn to Learn" there's some minutes of silence and then begins an acoustic song.
 Amesoeurs, Amesoeurs: An untitled hidden track begins after a few minutes of silence at the end of the album.
 Anal Cunt: Morbid Florist: Rewind track one, a cover of The Doors' "Hello, I Love You" exists in the pregap.
 Anathema:
 "Pentecost III": Final track "Memento Mori" includes two hidden tracks "Horses" (starts at 9:12) and "666" (starts at 10:21).
 A Fine Day to Exit: "Temporary Peace" ends at roughly 6 minutes. The main song ends with the sound of waves crashing on a beach. But, after 2 minutes the band members start a monologue for 2 minutes, making it sound like a "mad person" is talking to himself. The sound of waves remain for 3 minutes of the track. Finally, in the remaining 3 minutes, a hidden song performed with acoustic guitars is played. As they finish singing, the audio track ends.
 The Optimist: Untitled hidden track begins at 10:32 after the final track.
 ...And You Will Know Us By The Trail Of Dead, Madonna: There is a hidden track following a short period of silence after the last track.
 Andi Deris, Done by Mirrors: After some seconds of "Do You Really Wanna Know" [Japanese Bonus Track] a keyboard + clock ticking song starts.
 Ian Anderson:
 Rupi's Dance: "Birthday Card at Christmas" after some silence.
 The Secret Language of Birds: "In the Grip of Stronger Stuff" and "Thick as a Brick" at the end of the album, but this hidden track is not on all of the copies.
 Annihilator, Carnival Diablos: "Chicken and Corn" following on from "Hunter Killer" after a minute of silence.
 Another World: The song "Another World" ends at 4:05, then after a minute of silence the piano solo part of the album's second track,"Business," is played to the end. The Japanese edition of the album does not have a hidden track.
 Anthrax:
 Volume 8: The Threat Is Real: "Pieces," featuring bassist Frank Bello on lead vocals, following the final track.
 We've Come for You All: At the end of "We're a Happy Family," after 2 minutes of silence.
 Anti-Flag:
 Mobilize: Following the final track and some silence, there are several audio clips of Anti-Flag and Spazz talking on stage. Following that, there is more silence, then a skit involving "The Bear" in the studio.
 The People or the Gun: "Teenage Kennedy Lobotomy" following the final track, "The Old Guard."
 Angie Aparo: Title Track of "The American" follows five silent tracks at the end of the album.
 Apocalyptica - Apocalyptica: "Wie Weit/How Far/En Vie|En Vie." The song is within another song on the album entitled "Deathzone." "Deathzone" ends at 4:34; after that, there is 2:06 of silence, which at 6:40, "En Vie" starts.
 Apoptygma Berzerk:
 APBL98: Right after track 18, "Enjoy the Silence" a hidden track titled "Excerpts from Leipzig (Support Your Local Polizei)" is heard where apparently, the concert has been stopped by the local police.
 Harmonizer A hidden track can be heard immediately after track 12 "Unicorn (Original Version)" . In the Metropolis Records Edition, the same untitled track can be heard after "Something I Should Know."
 Welcome to Earth the Hidden track "Untitled 4" can be heard by fast forwarding the 13th track, "Time to Move On" to 8:58. The remastered edition contains "Untitled 4" as a stand-alone track.
 The Aquabats:
 The Fury of the Aquabats!: After 2 minutes and 34 seconds of silence, the final track is "Playdough Revisited!"
 Myths, Legends, and Other Amazing Adventures, Vol. 2: At the end of the album, there is more of the phone conversation with Danger Woman from track 10.
 The Return of the Aquabats: The final track ends at 3:44, but at 4:48, 18 seconds of laughter and snorting follow.
 Arcade Fire, Reflektor: There are two known untitled hidden tracks. One hidden in Disc 1's pregap featuring outtakes from the album, and one after the final track on Disc 2.
 Arckanum:
 Arckanum - The 11 Year Anniversary Album: There are three unlisted tracks, "Kosmos Wardhin Dræpas Om Sin", "Vm Kaos Gatvm Ok Kosmos" and "Bafomet".
 Helvítismyrkr: Hidden outro track at the end of track 8.
 Arcturus, La Masquerade Infernale: Untitled hidden track in the album's pregap.
 On the Australian edition of Tina Arena's album In Deep, the 12th and final track, titled "Stay," is followed by a piano reprise of an earlier track, "Burn" on the same track, which is in total over 10 minutes.
 Jann Arden, Happy?: Jann's cover of "To Sir with Love" is heard after the last listed track at approximately 5:48.
 Argyle Park, Misguided: Following the track "Uffern," a number of silent tracks, each under a minute long, separate three hidden features from the bulk of the album and from each other.
 Armor for Sleep, What to Do When You Are Dead: A hidden suicide note can be played by immediately rewinding the first track to approximately -1:30.
 Art Brut, Bang Bang Rock & Roll: An instrumental titled "Subliminal Desire for Adventure" in the pregap of "Formed a Band."
 As Tall As Lions, The song "A Soft Hum" is played after a few minute delay in "Maybe I'm Just Tired" in their self-titled album.
 Ash:
 1977: Early pressings of the album had "Jack Names the Planets" and "Don't Know" hidden in the pregap before track 1, while all pressings feature "Sick Party" at 11:12 of the final track.
 Trailer: Most pressings of Trailer had a hidden song, after "Get Out," which could only be accessed by digitally mixing it. The hidden song was an alternative version of Intense Thing, which was shorter and had a different drum beat, and the vocals are extremely hard to hear.
 Islands: Standard CD includes an extra song, "Easy Girl", starting 2:00 after the end of track 12, "Incoming Waves".
 Asking Alexandria, Asking Alexandria: After a period of silence on physical copies of the album following the final track (a radio edit of "Into the Fire"), there is a hidden track named "Xplicit".
 Atari Teenage Riot, The Future of War: "She Sucks My Soul Away," "Strike," and "Midijunkies - Berlin Mix" at the end of the album.
 Atlas, Reasons for Voyaging: After the final track "Doctor," there is a period of silence and at 5:23, there is a hidden song called "Firefly."
 Atreyu, Lead Sails Paper Anchor: after the last song "Lead Sails (and a paper anchor)" there is a pause then a cover of the song "Epic" begins to play.
 Atmosphere:
 Lucy Ford: The Atmosphere EPs: At 7 Minutes "Homecoming" with El-P after "Nothing But Sunshine"
 Seven's Travels: "Say Shhh..." at the end of the album
 Audio Adrenaline:
 bloOm: A brief studio outtake at the end of final track "Memoir."
 Some Kind of Zombie: The "Criscotech Remix" of "Some Kind of Zombie" at the end of the final track "Superfriend."
 Audio Bullys, Ego War: Hidden track approximately 2 minutes after the last track.
 Auf der Maur, Auf der Maur (album): "Taste You" sung in French appears after "I Need I Want I Will."
 Autechre:
 LP5: An untitled track follows either a long period of silence on track 11, or appears as track 12.
 EP7: To hear the untitled track, you need to rewind from track 1. The untitled track runs from -9:47 to -3:00, after which there is three minutes of silence.
 The Auteurs, New Wave: "Subculture" appears after last listed track "Home Again."
 Authority Zero, Andiamó: "Rattlin' Bog," a song that constantly builds upon itself, performed live, appears at the end of the album.
 Avalon, Oxygen: The song "Beyond the Clouds" plays after the last listed track of the album.
 AWOLNATION, Megalithic Symphony: An untitled hidden track with demos/outtakes of the tracks "All I Need" and "Knights Of Shame" plays two minutes and two seconds after the final listed song, "Knights of Shame".
 The Avett Brothers, Four Thieves Gone: Two hidden recordings at the end of the last track.
 Ayumi Hamasaki:
 A Best 2: Black: "Memorial address" at the end of the album, previously released on a mini-album by the same title.
 I am...: "flower garden" at the end of the album.
 Loveppears: "Kanariya" at the end of the album.
 Rainbow: "+" follows the abrupt ending of the final listed track "independent."
 AZ (rapper), A.W.O.L.: At the end of the album's last track, three hidden tracks, "Live Wire," "Magic Hour" and "The Truth" start playing.

See also
 List of backmasked messages
 List of albums with tracks hidden in the pregap

References 

Lists of albums containing hidden tracks